The Victoria Cross (VC) was awarded 628 times to 627 recipients for action in the First World War (1914–1918). The Victoria Cross is a military decoration awarded for valor "in the face of the enemy" to members of armed forces of some Commonwealth countries and previous British Empire territories. It takes precedence over all other Orders, decorations and medals; it may be awarded to a person of any rank in any service and to civilians under military command. The award was officially constituted when Queen Victoria issued a warrant under the Royal sign-manual on 29 January 1856 that was gazetted on 5 February 1856. The order was backdated to 1854 to recognize acts of valor during the Crimean War. The first awards ceremony was held on 26 June 1857, where Queen Victoria invested 62 of the 111 Crimean recipients in a ceremony in Hyde Park.

The First World War, also known as the Great War and in the United States as World War I, was a global military conflict that embroiled most of the world's great powers, assembled in two opposing alliances: the Triple Entente and the Triple Alliance. More than 70 million military personnel were mobilized in one of the largest wars in history. The main combatants descended into a state of total war, directing their entire scientific and industrial capabilities into the war effort. Over 15 million people were killed, making it one of the deadliest conflicts in history. The proximate cause of war was the assassination on 28 June 1914 of Archduke Franz Ferdinand of Austria. Soon after, a system of alliances were activated that would see Europe at war. The Western Front saw the largest concentration of Commonwealth troops with soldiers occupying sectors of the line from the North Sea to the Orne River.

On 1 July 1916, the first day of the Battle of the Somme, the British Army endured the bloodiest day in its history, suffering 57,470 casualties and 19,240 dead; nine Victoria Crosses were awarded for action on that day. Most of the casualties occurred in the first hour of the attack. The entire Somme offensive cost the British Army almost half a million men. The war was not just fought on land; the First World War saw major naval battles as well as the first large-scale use of military aircraft. The war at sea was mainly characterized by the efforts of the Allied Powers in blockading the Central Powers by sea. In return, the Central Powers attempted to break that blockade and establish an effective blockade of the British Isles and France with U-boats and raiders. The largest naval battle of the First World War was the Battle of Jutland which was the only full-scale clash of battleships in that war. Four Victoria Crosses were awarded for action at Jutland. The war in the air saw 19 VCs being awarded to airmen. The First World War saw significant interest in flying aces, including the German Manfred von Richthofen—also known as The Red Baron—as well as British aces such as Albert Ball, Mick Mannock and Billy Bishop, who were all Victoria Cross recipients. Hostilities ended on 11 November 1918 with the signing of the Armistice Treaty in the Compiègne Forest, but the war was not officially over until the various peace treaties were signed in 1919. By the war's end, four major imperial powers – Germany, Russia, Austria-Hungary, and the Ottoman Empire—had been militarily and politically defeated, and the latter two ceased to exist as autonomous entities. Of the 60 million European soldiers who were mobilized from 1914–1918, 8 million were killed, 7 million were permanently disabled, and 15 million were seriously injured.

During the war, Britain called on its dominions and colonies, which provided invaluable military, financial and material support. The armies of the Dominions provided over 2.5 million men as well as many thousands of volunteers from the Crown colonies. The largest number of men came from the Indian sub continent, Canada, Australia and New Zealand. The Indian Contingent consisted of over 130,000 men in various capabilities and served primarily in France and Belgium.  Over 9000 of them died and 11 of them were awarded the VC. The Australian Imperial Force (AIF) began forming on 15 August 1914 and remained a volunteer force for the entire war. Throughout the four years of conflict, 331,814 volunteers from Australia were sent overseas with 63 VCs awarded; nine of these were given for the Gallipoli Campaign. Eleven members of the New Zealand Expeditionary Force (NZEF) were awarded the Victoria Cross. The Canadian Expeditionary Force (CEF) saw over 600,000 enlistments throughout its four-year history with 71 VCs awarded. At the outbreak of the hostilities, Newfoundland was a separate dominion and 2 soldiers from Newfoundland were awarded the Victoria Cross.

The 628 awards of the Victoria Cross given for action during the First World War account for almost half the 1356 Victoria Crosses awarded throughout its history; in comparison the Second World War saw 181 medals awarded. Noel Godfrey Chavasse was awarded the Victoria Cross and Bar, for two separate actions in the First World War on the battlefields of Mametz and Passchendaele. He died from wounds received in the second action. Arthur Martin-Leake received a Bar to his Victoria Cross for action in the First World War; he had been awarded his first Victoria Cross for action in the Second Boer War.

Of the 627 recipients 159 (25.36%) were awarded posthumously.

Recipients

Footnotes

A Victoria Cross was awarded for several acts in the time period.
B Chavasse died of his wounds two days after the deed which merited his second Victoria Cross.
C Died of his wounds
D Martin-Leake's second Victoria Cross

References

Further reading

  Index of First World War VCs, also indicates original Gazette in which citation appeared, and some corrections to the original entries.

 First World War Victoria Cross Winners Dictionary of Canadian Biography

First World War

Victoria Cross
Victoria Cross